"Zangai" (残骸) (lit. Ruins) is the twenty-first single by the Japanese rock band Buck-Tick, released on January 8, 2003.

Track listing

Personnel
Atsushi Sakurai - vocals
Hisahi Imai - main guitar
Hidehiko Hoshino - guitar
Yutaka Higuchi - bass
Toll Yagami - drums
Kazutoshi Yokoyama - keyboard

References

2003 singles
Buck-Tick songs
2003 songs
BMG Japan singles
Songs with lyrics by Atsushi Sakurai
Songs with music by Hisashi Imai